{{Infobox person
| honorific_prefix   = 
| name               =  Thomas Elder BARR SMITH
| honorific_suffix   = 
| image              =  Thomas Elder BARR SMITH ca 1914 (SLSA B 36432).jpg
| image_size         = 
| alt                = 
| caption            = 
| birth_date         = 
| birth_place        = Woodville, South Australia
| death_date         = 
| death_place        = 
| death_cause        = 
| resting_place      = 
| resting_place_coordinates =  
| burial_place       =  
| burial_coordinates =  
| monuments          = 
| education          = 
| alma_mater         = 
| occupation         = 
| years_active       = 
| spouse             =  Mary Isabel Mitchell
| children           = 
| parents            =  Robert Barr Smith and Joanna Lang Barr Smith, (née Elder)
| relatives          =  Mary Downer nee Gosse (granddaughter)
}}
Thomas Elder Barr Smith (8 December 1863 – 26 November 1941) was a South Australian pastoralist and philanthropist.

Tom Barr Smith was born in Woodville, South Australia, the son of Robert Barr Smith, 
and his wife Joanna Lang, née'' Elder.

On 5 May 1886 he married Mary Isabel Mitchell, at St Andrew's Church, Walkerville.

In 1917, Barr Smith subdivided his estate, which became the Adelaide suburb of Torrens Park.

In 1928 he gave £30,000 to the University of Adelaide to enable the building of the Barr Smith Library.

His interests included competing in car rallies. A steam locomotive, now preserved in the National Railway Museum, Port Adelaide, was named after him in 1926.

There is a plaque in his honour on the Jubilee 150 Walkway.

Family
Father: Robert Barr Smith (1824–1915)
Mother: Joanna Elder - sister of Sir Thomas Elder
Uncles: Sir Thomas Elder (1818–1897), William Elder (1813–1882), Alexander Lang Elder (1815–1885) and George Elder (1816–1897)
Daughter: Joanna Lang Barr Smith, Lady Gosse (1886–1965) married Sir James Hay Gosse (1876–1952) on 29 April 1908, at St. Andrew's, Walkerville, South Australia.
Son: Sir Tom Elder Barr Smith (1904–1968)

References

1863 births
1941 deaths
Tom Elder